Yatap-dong (야탑동, 野塔洞) is a Bundang neighborhood in the city of Seongnam, Gyeonggi Province, South Korea. It is officially divided into Yatap-1-dong, Yatap-2-dong, and Yatap-3-dong.

A survey conducted in 2011 by the Ministry of Land, Transport and Maritime Affairs, reported that the bus stops in Yatap-dong are among the busiest in the country.

Yatap-dong is composed of many cultural spaces. Seongnam art center, Tancheon Sports Complex, NC department store, Home Plus are all available in Yatap-dong. CGV Theater and Seongnam bus terminal are there.

References

Bundang
Neighbourhoods in South Korea